This page is a glossary of architecture.

A

B

C

D

E

F

G

H

I

J

K

L

M

N

O

P

Q

R

S

T

U

V

W

Z

See also

 Outline of architecture
 List of classical architecture terms
 Classical order
 List of architectural vaults
 List of structural elements
 Glossary of engineering

Notes

References

  Page has search box.

Building engineering
Architecture
Architecture
 
Architectural elements
 architecture
Wikipedia glossaries using description lists